The Lembet Mosque is a historical Ottoman mosque in the city of Thessaloniki, in Greece, named after the Lembet barracks, now known as Pavlos Melas barracks. In 2013, the mosque's original name, Ferideh Hanim Mosque, was discovered thanks to an old inscription. It was named after Ferideh Hanim, the wife of Thessaloniki's then governor, Hassan Fehmi Pasha. It was the last mosque to be built in Thessaloniki before the city's incorporation into the Kingdom of Greece in 1912 following the First Balkan War.

History 
In 1903, during the last years of the Ottoman Empire's rule over the Macedonia, the Lembet Mosque was erected in Thessaloniki—the last to be built in the city—in the Topşu Kislaçi plot. It was inaugurated on August 18, 1903.

After the Ottoman army was defeated in the Battle of Yenidje (modern Giannitsa) during the First Balkan War in 1912, the city of Thessaloniki was incorporated to the Kingdom of Greece, and the military encampment the mosque was situated in was used by the Greek troops. The mosque itself served for non-religious purposes, but it is not clear when it was officially put to new use.

In 1999, the Greek army started to transfer the jurisdiction for use to the municipality of the city, but this procedure would continue until 2017. In 2003, the Greek Ministry of Culture and Sports declared the mosque a preserved monument. Meanwhile in 2005, work began for the widening of the main road connecting Thessaloniki to the north (Lagkadas and Serres) and the east of the country; the mosque found itself in the middle of the widened road. As a result, the mosque was moved 22 meters along its long axis (to the direction of Mecca). The base of the minaret, however, had to be demolished.

In 2011, restoration works began on the mosque. Although the local Muslim community requested the mosque be opened to worship again, their request was eventually rejected.

Architecture 

Lembet Mosque has two storeys, and a minaret in touch with the middle of the northwest facade. On the ground floor there are two entrances, two vestibules and two chambers, a storage room and a staircase leading to the upper floor. The use of the rooms on the ground floor is not known. On the floor there is an antechamber and the praying room. The building inscription, found on the vestibule of the first floor, is the only thing that testifies to Ferideh's connection to the mosque, and thus Lembet's original name.

The floor dimensions of the mosque are 18.19 m. x 13.52 m. and it is 11.22 meters tall, including the roof (3.22 m.). The area of each floor is 247.50 m2. As for the thickness of the walls, on the ground floor the external walls are 90 cm thick, the internal ones 60 cm NW to SE and 90 cm NE to SW. On the first floor the external walls are 80 cm thick, and internal walls 70 cm NE to SW.

The ceilings are made of wood, its simple decoration achieved by the arrangement of the boards, with additional rods and with relief elements. In the center of the mihrab hall there is a dome in the shape of a cruciform decorated with additional wooden elements. Around its perimeter, alternating rectangular and square sections are formed.

During the 2011 restoration works, the roof was restored, the windows of the upper floor were protected, the asbestos flues outside the building were removed, newer paltry interior walls and dropped ceilings were demolished, the praying niche (mihrab) was spotlighted, parts of the wall drawings were uncovered, the interior wooden staircase was reconstructed, the area surrounding the mosque was clear-cut and coated with grid and concrete, and the terrain was fenced.

See also 

 Islam in Greece
 List of former mosques in Greece
 List of mosques in Greece
 Ottoman Greece

References

Bibliography 
 .

Further reading

External links 
 

Former mosques in Greece
Ottoman mosques in Greece
Buildings and structures in Thessaloniki
20th-century architecture in Greece
Ottoman architecture in Thessaloniki
20th-century mosques
Mosques completed in 1903